Pathakhera is a town in the municipality of Sarni in the Betul District, Madhya Pradesh, India. The town is also known as Coal nagari and NCDC, an acronym for National Coal department company.

History and research on coalfields  
In 1845, the earliest systematic exploration of India’s coal resources was initiated by D.H.Williams, Geological Surveyor of the East India Company. In 1924, Dr. Cyril Fox surveyed once again certain coal-bearing areas, including the Pench, Kanhan and Tawa Valleys. Pathakhera is a part of Satpura Basin coal area as categorized by Geological survey of India. Greater Pathakhera or Pathakhera Area consists of Shobhapur colony, Kalimai and Bagdona, in addition to Pathakhera town, which was essentially created as western extension of Pench-Kanhan-Tawa valley coalfields project. In the vicinity of Pathakhera three coal seams have been encountered by boring. The top seam is of poor quality and the other seams are comparatively better in quality. Researchers of Birbal Sahni Institute of Palaeobotany, Lucknow has discovered the correlation of Gondwana coalfields with plant fossil data. Another research on the  analysis of coal sample has shown presence of fossils of 61 species of 37 genera. Researchers have also suggested the presence of Permian period fossil in this region  and the species mark the transition of the Permian level into the Lower Triassic. Coal from this region is usually subbituminous A to high volatile A bituminous rank.

Culture 
People in Pathakhera are associated with different religious beliefs. Major part of the population follows Hinduism, while significant numbers of Muslims, Buddhists, Christians and Jains are also present.

This small town houses number of Hindu temples, A Mosque and a Buddhist temple. The notable religious places includes Shiv Mandir, Vishwakarma Mandir, Gayatri Mandir,  Shitla devi Mandir, Pathakhera Masjid and Panchsheel Buddha Vihar.

Geography 
Pathakhera is located at coordinates 23.2943|N|78.1032|E| near the geographical center point of modern India. It has an average elevation of 508 m (1,669 ft). The town is a sister town of nearby town Sarni, which is famous for MPPGCL thermal Power station and Baba Mathardev temple.

The town is situated between Betul's Plateau and Satpura mountain range. The town is surrounded by dense forest conserved by MP forest department.

Transportation 
Pathakhera is situated on Betul- Chhindwara state highway SH 19B and well connected to different cities of the state by road. It is 45 km away from district headquarters and 175 km away from State capital Bhopal.

The nearest railway station is Ghoradongri, which is situated 18 km from the town. The closest airport is Raja Bhoj airport which is 180 km away from Pathakhera.

Economy 

Pathakhera is one of the key industrial town in Betul district. Pathakhera along with neighbouring towns- Shobhapur and Bagdona is known as Pathakhera area regulated by Western coalfields limited (WCL) headquartered at Nagpur.

Pathakhera was a dense forest area between 1960–70, a part of Satpura Valley. It was then leased by WCL from forest department and developed the town.

At present, there are eight coal mines of Western Coalfields (a subsidiary of Coal India Limited) in Pathakhera area, delivering coal to Satpura Thermal Power Station. WCL Pathakhera area has a record to win Madhya Pradesh government's Bhamashah award for one of the highest taxpaying entity in state.

In addition to Coal production, Ash brick micro industry, individual shops, clinics, schools and Weekly vegetable market also contribute to small scale economy.

Facilities 

Healthcare: The biggest hospital in area is WCL Area hospital owned by WCL for the benefit of its employees. WCL also maintains two WCL dispensaries- one in Pathakhera and other in Shobhapur colony. Non-employees can use WCL facilities in case of emergency or with the permission of Chief Medical Officer of area hospital.  State government has two governmental primary health center and one Urban health center. Other healthcare facilities includes private clinics, ayurvedic clinics, diagnostic laboratories and Medical stores.

Nursery: MP Government sanctioned a 4 hectares nursery in 1980 and currently being maintained by Horticulture and food processing department.

Animal care:One Government animal hospital is situated in Bajrang colony, Pathakhera for the benefit of animal owners in area.

NGOs: Many non-governmental organizations are also working in the area mostly focusing upon society's issues and skill development. Most notable one is Gram Bharti Mahila Mandal which is situated in Shobhapur colony and have won several awards from MP Government such as MP Jan abhiyan Parishad award for year 2012.

Education 
Education in area includes high schools, colleges and vocational training institutes.

Schools:
 Higher Secondary School, Pathakhera
 Little Flower Higher Secondary School
 Govt. Girls Primary School Pathakhera
 Govt Girls Middle School Pathakhera
 Govt. Girls  Higher Secondary School Pathakhera
 MGM School Bagdona
 Gyandeep Higher Secondary School
 TSS School Shobhapur
 Tarun shikhar High School
 Pragya High School
Colleges: in area are recognized by UGC and MP Department of education for Bachelors and Masters courses in Science, Arts and Commerce related subjects.
 Govt. College,Bagdona
 Indira Gandhi Kanya Mahavidyalaya, Shobhapur colony
Vocational training institutes are pretty attractive to the youth of the area and nearby villages.

Administration 
The town administration falls under Sarni Municipality area. The town has a police station which comes under the jurisdiction of Sarni sub divisional office of police. Ghoradongri is Taluka office for the town while Shahpur serves as revenue office. The people of the town votes for the Amla constituency for State representative ( Member of legislative assembly or MLA) and for Betul Parliamentary seat to elect National representative (Member of Parliament or MP). The current MLA is yogesh pandagare while the MP is Mrs Jyoti Dhurve.

Township management 
Pathakhera town is mainly managed by WCL Management as the town mostly house WCL employees. The management includes electricity supply, water supply, housing, roads, educational, medical and sanitation facilities. Sarni Municipality takes care of the facilities for non-employees public living in the town.

The apex manger of all coal mines as well as for the township is chief general manager. As of April 2017 it is I.D. Zankyani.

References 

Cities and towns in Betul district